On January 24, 2011, an Imperial Beach, California, man named Roger Stockham was arrested and charged with terrorism after attempting to blow up the Islamic Center of America in Dearborn, Michigan, which has large Arab-American and Muslim populations. The police made no comments as to his motive.
Stockham later said he opposed the Iraq war and targeted the mosque to "grab people's attention." He was arrested in the parking lot outside the mosque with a car filled with high-end, class C fireworks including M-80s. Possession of such fireworks is a 15-year felony in Michigan; the terrorism charge can carry up to 20 years. Police chief Roger Haddad described Stockham and the threat he posed as "very dangerous" and "very serious"; at the time Stockham was arrested, there were 500 worshippers inside the mosque. According to Haddad, Stockham had a history of anti-government activity and run-ins with law enforcement agencies elsewhere. He was arrested after the police received a tip from a bar employee who had overheard Stockham making violent threats. Haddad said that Stockham was likely acting alone. Dearborn Mayor John O'Reilly commented on the incident, saying that the explosives Stockham had, "if used in a building could cause tremendous harm".

Suspect
Roger Stockham is a United States Army Vietnam War veteran who was based in Pleiku. He had written on his Myspace page: "Proud of my kids. Happy with how much I've lived. Ready for it to be over, but have a policy I contend with often: So long as I am alive, I can't play dead."

In 1977, Stockham armed himself with bombs and took his psychologist hostage, but he surrendered later after meeting with a reporter.

On September 1, 1979, the Merced Sun-Star in California reported that Stockham, whom it described as a 32-year-old, had taken his then-9-year-old son Kane out of foster care and brought Kane and a gun on board his rented Cessna 150 in attempt to land at Los Angeles International Airport and hijack an airliner to take him to Iran. At one point, he was also accused of threatening President Jimmy Carter.

In 1985, Stockham was arrested at Reno-Cannon International Airport for planting a pipe bomb and carrying an unregistered firearm, an incident covered in the Los Angeles Times. Aged 38 at the time, he was described as having mental and criminal problems. According to psychiatrists, he believed he was Jesus Christ and that extraterrestrials had taken over his body.

Stockham is a member of his local chapter of Veterans of Foreign Wars (VFW). In his profile on the VFW website, he is described as a "typical surfer" whose other hobbies include water skiing, sailing, and go-cart racing. He was at one point a commercial bush pilot in Indonesia. In 2002, he pleaded Not Guilty By Reason of Insanity to threatening to blow up a Veterans Administration Center in Vermont and making threats against President George W. Bush.

Court proceedings and guilty plea
Stockham rejected his court-appointed attorney because he claimed the attorney was a Shi'ite Muslim who worships at the Islamic Center. Stockham stated, “I reject my appointed counsel. He is a Shi'ite and I am not” before he was cut off by federal Judge Mark Somers. It was revealed that Stockham had actually converted to Islam shortly after returning from in Vietnam and was outraged over U.S. conduct in Iraq. The chairman of the board for the Islamic Center of America, Afif Jawad, who attended the hearing, said he and other leaders continue to meet with local and federal law enforcement officials about the incident. Jawad stated: "This man knows what he's doing" and "This man picked on the Shiites....That's a threat to the community."

In April 2012, Stockham agreed to a "guilty but mentally ill" plea. He was held at the Federal Medical Center, Devens, in Massachusetts for psychiatric treatment. He was released from federal custody in November 2012. In May 2013, a Federal judge ruled that Stockham could be released to a community facility with orders to continue taking his psychiatric medication. The community facility is likely to be in Burlington, Vermont, although this is unconfirmed.

Reactions and aftermath
On January 28, 2011, Imam Sayyid Hassan al-Qazwini of the Islamic Center of America addressed the Shi'ite Muslim community regarding the plot. According to al-Qazwini, the police indicated to him that Stockham had said to the police that he regarded
Timothy McVeigh as his role model.

7/28/2015, Roger Stockham/Hem Ahadin was released from prison in Vermont on 6/13/13 and has been residing in Burlington, VT, since, without incident.  He is now a Zen Master.  His autobiography is on Kindle:  "NOWMENON - A Different Reality."

References

2011 in Michigan
Explosions in 2011
2011 in Islam
January 2011 crimes
January 2011 events in the United States
Arab and Islamic culture in Dearborn, Michigan
Anti-Muslim violence in the United States
Terrorist incidents in Michigan
Terrorist incidents in the United States in 2011
Failed terrorist attempts in the United States
Violence against Muslims
Crimes in Michigan
Attacks on Shiite mosques
Reno–Tahoe International Airport